Thoothukudi division is a revenue division in the Thoothukudi district of Tamil Nadu, India.

References 
 

Thoothukudi district